Methia juniperi is a species of beetle in the family Cerambycidae. It was described by Linsley in 1937.

References

Methiini
Beetles described in 1937